Gemma Bissix (born 6 June 1983) is an English actress. She has been acting since the age of 9. Her most prominent roles have been in soap operas, as Clare Bates in EastEnders (1993–1998, 2008) and Clare Devine in Hollyoaks (2006–2007, 2009, 2013); she was awarded with two British Soap Awards for the latter role. Away from soap opera, Bissix has appeared in various television programmes and she competed in the 2009 series of Dancing on Ice. She has appeared in various pantomimes. Bissix  returned to Hollyoaks in 2013.

Personal life
Bissix was born in St Peter's Hospital in Chertsey, Surrey, UK, the eldest of five siblings. Her parents divorced when she was 11. She was brought up in Elmbridge, Surrey, and attended Thames Ditton Middle School and Hinchley Wood School.

She is a patron of the White Lodge Centre for disabled adults and children in Chertsey, and hosts charity auctions at her father's bar, Reds, in Weybridge.

Career

Acting
Bissix began her acting career at a young age. At the age of nine, in 1993, she was cast as Clare Tyler (later Bates), the daughter of Debbie Tyler (Nicola Duffett) and stepdaughter of Nigel Bates (Paul Bradley), in the long-running BBC soap opera, EastEnders. Her first acting role, Bissix had received no formal training, and has since commented, "that was my training [...] quite a lot of people [attend] drama school, I was trained by EastEnders."

Following her departure from EastEnders, Bissix took a break from acting for a few years. After leaving school she ran a pub for two years, worked for her father's electrical wholesalers, and also worked in Marks & Spencer as a bra measurer. However, she still desired to act, and continued to audition for roles. In 2000 she guest starred in the Doctor Who radio drama, The Fires of Vulcan, and in 2002 she returned to television, guest starring in an episode of the medical drama series Doctors. She then played Sadie in an episode of the CBBC show The Crust and also appeared in three pantomimes and various adverts.

In April 2006, she joined the cast of the Channel 4 soap opera Hollyoaks, playing Clare Devine (later Cunningham). She took over the role from model/actress Samantha Rowley, who had played the character since November 2005, but was subsequently axed because the producers wished to take the character, who had been cast as a likeable teenager until this point, into a darker and more "evil" persona, and Rowley did not want to play a villain. Hollyoaks producer Bryan Kirkwood commented, "Gemma was a fantastic asset to the Hollyoaks cast. Recasting Gemma in the role of Clare was the first thing I did when I joined Hollyoaks and it was a decision which paid off handsomely. She was excellent in the role of Clare Cunningham and I wish her all the best of luck..."

On 19 September 2007,  it was announced that Bissix would be reprising her role as Clare Bates in EastEnders, ten years after she had last appeared in the soap. She was reintroduced by the executive producer of EastEnders, Diederick Santer, and returned on-screen on 1 February 2008. Of her decision to return to EastEnders, Bissix has said "I'm ecstatic. It really is fantastic. Clare's a deeper character [than Clare was in Hollyoaks] – I've got more scope with her and it's more of a challenge. I'm back home...". It was announced on 23 May 2008 that Bissix was leaving the soap once again in Summer 2008.

She returned to Hollyoaks as Clare Devine for a brief stint in May 2009. Discussing her soap opera roles in EastEnders and Hollyoaks Bissix said, "For me they're completely different. I prefer Hollyoaks Clare because she is just so much fun to play.  I was saying to somebody that if she was in the real world, she'd be in prison or on death row. With the EastEnders Clare she was more realistic. We all know somebody like that – a little tart trying to get a bit of money where she can." On 5 February 2013 it was confirmed that Bissix would reprise her role as villain Clare Devine, and made her final appearance in the soap on 16 October 2013, after the character of Clare was killed off.

Bissix appeared in the fourth episode of ITV musical drama series, Britannia High, titled Fame. She toured in Victor Leigh's stage play The Game Of Murder for two months, beginning August 2009. She appeared in pantomime as the Bad Fairy in Sleeping Beauty at the Theatre Royal, Bath in December 2009. It was also reported in 2009 that she is the new face of Echo Falls wine. In 2010 she appeared in pantomime again as Cinderella at Fairfield Halls, Croydon, and in Spring 2011, she appeared in the murder mystery theatre production, Busybody.

She ended 2011 by making another pantomime appearance at the Grove Theatre, Dunstable in Jack and the Beanstalk.  Bissix toured the UK as Shirley Smith in Mike Stott's comedy play, Funny Peculiar, in 2012.

Other television work
On 14 March 2008, Bissix appeared on a Sport Relief special of Strictly Come Dancing, with cricketer Darren Gough, to raise money for the charity appeal. The pair scored 22 out of 30 points with their dance, the American Smooth. She also appeared in an EastEnders special edition of The Weakest Link, in June 2008. She was the 1st one voted off.

Bissix appeared on Dancing on Ice in 2009. She was partnered with Andrei Lipanov, but became the first female to be eliminated after failing to win the judges support in the skate-off with Melinda Messenger. 'Bissix said she was "absolutely gutted" at being voted off as she was the show's "biggest fan".' She later took part in the Sense City Ice Skate challenge in support of Sense-National Deafblind and Rubella Association.

She was one of various celebrities to participate in BBC's Celebrity MasterChef, which aired in June 2009. She was selected by the judges to go through to the quarter-final. In October 2009 she appeared on the BBC One show Hole in the Wall. She was a member of the winning team, donating the winnings to the White Lodge centre for disabled adults in Chertsey, of which she is a Patron. In April 2011 she appeared on the Celebrity Edition of the BBC One show Total Wipeout. Since 2009, Bissix has been a panellist on some editions of the Channel 5 talk show The Wright Stuff contributing to a newspaper review and topical debate.

Filmography

Awards

References

External links

1983 births
Living people
Actresses from Surrey
English child actresses
English soap opera actresses
People from Chertsey
People from Walton-on-Thames